Holy Trinity Church, Micklegate, York is a Grade I listed parish church in the Church of England in York.

History

The church was a Benedictine monastery founded in 1089 as Micklegate Priory, York by Ralph Paynel, and dedicated to the Holy Trinity. It fronted on Micklegate, in the city of York, England. It was under the care of the Benedictine Abbey of Marmoutier. The site had previously been used for Christ Church, a house of secular canons. The church dates from the 12th century with additions in the 13th and 14th centuries. The tower dates from 1453. The church was remodelled after the Dissolution of the Monasteries.

The south aisle was rebuilt during a restoration between 1850 and 1851 by JB and W Atkinson of York.

The chancel and vestry were rebuilt between 1886 and 1887 by Fisher and Hepper. It included a new vestry and organ chamber.

The west front was reconstructed in 1902 to 1905 by Charles Hodgson Fowler.

In 1934 the church was united with St John's Church, Micklegate, York and in 1953 with St Martin-cum-Gregory, Micklegate.

Church hall

Jacob's Well is the church hall located on Trinity Lane. It is a Grade I listed medieval building.

Stained glass

The church contains stained glass of national significance. Kempe, whose work features extensively, stands as one of the leading national figures in nineteenth and twentieth century decorative art.1 The church also contains windows by two of York's most significant exponents of the Gothic Revival, Barnett and Knowles. Although seemingly insignificant, the Pace/Stammers window represents the collaboration between one of Britain's most influential modern architects and one of the UK's most important twentieth-century stained glass designers.

 East Window (1907) by Charles Eamer Kempe. The window is regarded as one of Kempe's last works before his death in April 1907. The window shows Christ on the cross, as well as saints including Helena and John, and various representations of the Trinity.
 North Chancel (1850) by John Joseph Barnett (1789-1859) of York. This is the earliest surviving stained glass in the church.
 North Nave (1877) by John Ward Knowles.
 St Nicholas Chapel (1905) by Charles Eamer Kempe depicting St Nicholas resurrecting three children who had been killed in a barrel of brine.
 St Nicholas Chapel (1953) by George Pace and Harry Stammers.
 West Window (1904) by Charles Eamer Kempe depicting saints Benedict, James, Martin and Thomas whose altars could be found in the former Benedictine priory church.

Memorials

Dr. John Burton (d. 1771) (the model for Doctor Slop in Laurence Sterne’s novel The Life and Opinions of Tristram Shandy, Gentleman).
 For about two hundred years from 1700, many of the sisters from the Bar Convent were buried in the churchyard and Chancel.

Organ

The pipe organ dates from 1906 and is by Norman and Beard. A specification of the organ can be found on the National Pipe Organ Register.

References

Further reading
 

Holy Trinity
Holy Trinity
Micklegate